Phalaenopsis rundumensis, is a species of orchid native to Borneo.

Description
The plants usually have 2-3, 20-23 cm long and 7-10 cm wide leaves. The 5.8 cm high flowers with an elliptic midlobe and dentate apex of the labellum, which are sequentially produced in groups of 2-3 on a slowly elongating inflorescence, show highly variable floral colouration.

Etymology
The type specimen was collected in the Rundum area of Sabah, which is reflected in the specific epithet rundumensis.

Ecology
The first specimens were collected in forests at elevations of 600-800 m above sea level.

Taxonomy
This species is a member of the species complex involving Phalaenopsis kapuasensis, Phalaenopsis gigantea and Phalaenopsis doweryensis. It may be intermediate between Phalaenopsis gigantea and Phalaenopsis doweryensis.

References

rundumensis
Orchids of Borneo
Endemic flora of Borneo
Plants described in 2011